Vendela is a feminine given name. It may refer to:

 Wendla Åberg (1791–1864), Swedish dancer
 Wendela Hebbe, Swedish journalist
 Vendela Kirsebom, Turkish-Norwegian-Swedish model and actress 
 Vendela Skytte, Swedish poet
 Wendela Gustafva Sparre, Swedish artist
 Vendela Vida, American novelist and journalist
 Vendela Zachrisson-Santén, Swedish competitive sailor and Olympic medalist

Other
 Vendela (novel)

Feminine given names